Know No Better is the fourth extended play (EP) by American electronic music trio Major Lazer, released on June 1, 2017, by Mad Decent.

Background
The EP includes 6 tracks featuring collaborations with numerous artists, including Travis Scott, Camila Cabello, Quavo, J Balvin, Sean Paul, Nasty C, Ice Prince, Patoranking, Jidenna, Busy Signal, Machel Montano, Konshens and Brazilian singers Anitta and Pabllo Vittar.

Singles
The lead single, "Know No Better", was announced as the original lead single on May 22, 2017, to be released official single with on May 31, 2017, featuring vocals from American rappers, Travis Scott and Quavo, and Cuban-American singer Camila Cabello. Major Lazer later clarified, by tweeting out that the song would be released on June 1, at 8 AM ET, 12 PM BST. Camila Cabello teased the original track on May 26, by tweeting out lyrics from the song. She also posted snippets of the song on her Snapchat story the same day.

The second single, "Sua Cara", was announced in February 2017, to be released official single with on July 30, 2017, featuring vocals from Brazilian singers Anitta and Pabllo Vittar. On June 20, Major Lazer traveled to Morocco along with Anitta and Pabllo Vittar to record the music video for "Sua Cara". It was directed by Bruno Ilogti.

Other songs
A music video for the song "Particula" was released on October 12, 2017. The song also appeared on Give Me Future. Music videos for the songs "Buscando Huellas" and "Jump" were also released.

Critical reception
Andy Cush of Spin wrote that the EP "sounds the same". He added, "Maybe at some point soon they'll recognize that the magic of these particular tricks is starting to wear out. Or, like the title of the record implies, maybe they don't know anything better". Pitchfork's Jonah Bromwich gave the EP a positive review, stating that: "And as fun as it is at times, Know No Better doubles as a testament to the result of spreading a handful of good ideas too thin."

Track listing

  signifies a co-producer.
  signifies an additional producer.
 All songwriting credits are adapted from liner notes.

Charts

Weekly charts

Year-end charts

References

2017 EPs
Albums produced by Major Lazer
Major Lazer albums
Moombahton EPs
Portuguese-language EPs
Spanish-language EPs